Josef Hora (8 July 1891 – 21 June 1945) was a Czechoslovak poet, literary critic and journalist.

Biography

Early life
Josef Hora was born in Dobříň, Litoměřice District, Bohemia in a farmstead, which now houses the Museum of Josef Hora. His father soon sold the house in the village and the family moved to Prague. In 1896, his parents broke up and Josef with his mother returned first to Dobříň and then to Roudnice where Josef studied at a gymnasium. Here he tried to write poetry and he even published his experiments in a ladies´ magazine. In 1910, he was enrolled at the Law Faculty of Charles University in Prague.  He joined the social democratic party in 1912 and started writing for its papers and magazines. He became an editor of a local paper where he met Zdenka Janoušková. He married her in 1919 and they had a daughter.

Communist career and the schism from the Party
After graduating from a university (1916) with the help of Ivan Olbracht, he started work for Právo lidu (a major social democratic newspaper) and later for Rudé právo (a newly established communist newspaper)  and became a member of the KSČ. As an editor of the cultural section of Rudé právo he helped a lot of young talented poets and writers not only publish their work but also find jobs or accommodation in Prague. He made a trip to the USSR in 1925 that showed him not only the successes of the new regime (he was part of a delegation) but also its problems with democracy. Hora stopped writing proletarian poetry and in 1929 he and several other Czech writers (Jaroslav Seifert, Vladislav Vančura, S.K. Neumann, Marie Majerová, Ivan Olbracht and his wife Helena Malířová) expressed disapproval with the new Stalinist leadership of Klement Gottwald. They were all expelled from the party and set at variance with ten other left-wing authors (among them Vítězslav Nezval, Karel Konrád, Julius Fučík and Jiří Weil). Josef Hora wrote an essay about the situation called Literature and Politics.

1930s, against Nazism and Hora's death
In 1933, Hora became an editor of the cultural pages of the České slovo newspaper  and he also edited several literary journals. He was elected president of the Society of Czech Writers in 1934 and worked against the fascist menace from outside and inside. 
He travelled a lot in the 1930s (Estonia, Slovakia, Hungary, Slovenia).
In 1938, he was one of the initiators of the petition Věrni zůstaneme! eventually signed by more than a million people. Just after Munich Agreement he became a co-author of a manifest To All the Civilised World (Celému civilizovanému světu). He was one of the seven funeral orators above the coffin of Karel Čapek. He exchanged more conservative Jaroslav Durych as a president of the Literary department of Art Forum and from his post helped many people afflicted with war, especially during Heydrich′s protectorship risking his life. In 1939, he wrote to a resistance magazine under the name of Jan Víra. In 1941, he withdrew from public life partly due to intensive intervention of Nazi censorship in the Czech press and partly due to his illness. Josef Hora died shortly after the liberation of Czechoslovakia in Prague at the age of 53 and was buried in Slavín.

Legacy

A day after his death, Josef Hora was nominated as National Artist (a title that had been granted only to living artists since 1932) and became the first to be awarded posthumously. 
He was counted among Communist writers in Czechoslovakia (1948–1989) and his disillusionment with Stalinism was concealed.

List of major works

Poetry
His work created a link with Czech prewar modernism, closely associated with the literary trends of its time. He always stood apart the modern -isms and literary groups such as Devětsil. 
Básně – 1915
Strom v květu – 1920
Itálie – 1925
Struny ve větru – 1927
Mít křídla – 1928
Tvůj hlas – 1930
Tonoucí stíny – 1933
Dvě minuty ticha – 1934
Tiché poselství – 1936
Máchovská variace – 1936
Domov – 1938
Jan houslista – 1939

Prose
Hladový rok – 1926
Socialistické naděje – 1922
Dech na skle – 1938

Translation
Alexander Pushkin, Mikhail Lermontov, Sergey Yesenin, Maxim Gorky, Ilya Erenburg, Leo Tolstoy, Johann Wolfgang Goethe

A sample of Hora's poetry
"Christ at the parting of the ways" is a poem from the collection Strom v květu ("A Tree in Blossom") published in 1920 which established the author's reputation.

Two strophes from Máchovské variace (part III, 1936) present one of Hora′s views of the nature of Czech Romantic poet Karel Hynek Mácha on the occasion of the centenary of his death:

"Shadow" is a poem from the collection Struny ve větru ("Strings in the Wind", 1927), acclaimed by critics (e.g. F.X. Šalda) and poets (e.g. Vladimír Holan and Jaroslav Seifert).

References

External links
 Books of poems and other texts by Josef Hory available for free download from the website of the Municipal Library in Prague (in Czech)
 Extensive biography
 

1891 births
1945 deaths
People from Litoměřice District
Czechoslovak writers
Czechoslovak communists
Recipients of the Order of Tomáš Garrigue Masaryk
Czechoslovak translators
Charles University alumni